South Shore High School may refer to:

 South Shore High School (Brooklyn)
 South Shore High School (Chicago)
 South Shore High School (South Dakota)
 South Shore High School (Wisconsin) in Port Wing, Wisconsin